In mathematics, an elliptic divisibility sequence (EDS) is a sequence of integers satisfying a nonlinear recursion relation arising from division polynomials on elliptic curves.  EDS were first defined, and their arithmetic properties studied, by Morgan Ward 
in the 1940s. They attracted only sporadic attention until around 2000, when EDS were taken up as a class of nonlinear recurrences that are more amenable to analysis than most such sequences. This tractability is due primarily to the close connection between EDS and elliptic curves.  In addition to the intrinsic interest that EDS have within number theory, EDS have applications to other areas of mathematics including logic and cryptography.

Definition 
A (nondegenerate) elliptic divisibility sequence (EDS) is a sequence of integers 
defined recursively by four initial values 
with  ≠ 0 and with subsequent values determined by the formulas

Divisibility property 
An EDS is a divisibility sequence in the sense that

EDS are frequently normalized to have  = 1 by dividing every term by the initial term.

with   divisible by   lead to a normalized EDS on setting 

It is not obvious, but can be proven, that the condition   |  suffices to ensure that every term
in the sequence is an integer.

General recursion 
A fundamental property of elliptic divisibility sequences
is that they satisfy the general recursion relation

(This formula is often applied with  = 1 and  = 1.)

Nonsingular EDS 
The discriminant of a normalized EDS is the quantity

An EDS is nonsingular if its discriminant is nonzero.

Examples 
A simple example of an EDS is the sequence of natural numbers 1, 2, 3,... . Another interesting example is  1, 3, 8, 21, 55, 144, 377, 987,... consisting of every other term in the  Fibonacci sequence, starting with the second term. However, both of these sequences satisfy a linear recurrence and both are singular EDS. An example of a nonsingular EDS is

Periodicity of EDS 
A sequence  is said to be periodic
if there is a number  so
that  =  for every  ≥ 1.
If a nondegenerate EDS 
is periodic, then one of its terms vanishes. The smallest  ≥ 1 with  = 0 is called the rank of apparition of the EDS. A deep theorem of Mazur
implies that if the rank of apparition of an EDS is finite, then it satisfies  ≤ 10 or  = 12.

Elliptic curves and points associated to EDS 
Ward proves that associated to any nonsingular EDS
is an elliptic curve /Q and a point
 ε (Q) such that

Here ψ is the 
 division polynomial
There is
a complicated formula

There is an alternative definition of EDS that directly uses elliptic curves and yields a sequence which, up to sign, almost satisfies the EDS recursion. This definition starts with an elliptic curve /Q given by a Weierstrass equation and a nontorsion point  ε (Q).

Then the sequence is also called an elliptic divisibility sequence. It is a divisibility sequence, and there exists an integer  so that the subsequence ( ± ) ≥ 1 (with an appropriate choice of signs) is an EDS in the earlier sense.

Growth of EDS 
Let  be a nonsingular EDS
that is not periodic. Then the sequence grows quadratic exponentially in the sense that there is
a positive constant  such that

The number  is the canonical height of the point on 
the elliptic curve associated to the EDS.

Primes and primitive divisors in EDS 
It is conjectured that a nonsingular EDS contains only finitely many 
primes
However, all but finitely many terms in a nonsingular EDS admit a primitive prime 
divisor.
Thus for all but finitely many , 
there is a prime  such that  divides , but  does not divide  for all  < . This statement is an analogue of Zsigmondy's theorem.

EDS over finite fields 
An EDS over a finite field F, or more generally over any field, is a sequence of elements of that field satisfying the EDS recursion. An EDS over a finite field is always periodic, and thus has a rank of apparition . The period of an EDS over F then has the form , where  and  satisfy

Tate pairing of the point on the associated elliptic curve.

Applications of EDS 
Bjorn Poonen
has applied EDS to logic. He uses the existence of primitive divisors in EDS on elliptic curves of rank one to prove the undecidability of Hilbert's tenth problem over certain rings of integers.

Katherine E. Stange
has applied EDS and their higher rank generalizations called elliptic nets
to cryptography. She shows how EDS can be used to compute the value
of the Weil and Tate pairings on elliptic curves over finite
fields. These pairings have numerous applications in pairing-based cryptography.

References

Further material 

 G. Everest, A. van der Poorten, I. Shparlinski, and T. Ward. Recurrence sequences, volume 104 of Mathematical Surveys and Monographs. American Mathematical Society, Providence, RI, 2003. . (Chapter 10 is on EDS.)
 R. Shipsey. Elliptic divisibility sequences.   PhD thesis, Goldsmiths College (University of London), 2000.
 K. Stange. Elliptic nets. PhD thesis, Brown University, 2008.
 C. Swart. Sequences related to elliptic curves.   PhD thesis, Royal Holloway (University of London), 2003.

External links 
 Graham Everest's EDS web page.
 Prime Values of Elliptic Divisibility Sequences.
 Lecture on p-adic Properites of Elliptic Divisibility Sequences.

Number theory
Integer sequences